Ruhe (English: Silence or peace) is the third single from the 1999 Schiller debut album Zeitgeist with vocals by an unknown woman and an unknown man and spoken word passages by German actor and voice actor Benjamin Völz (* 13. Mai 1960), who became famous in the German-speaking countries as the voice of FBI Special Agent Fox Mulder from the American television series The X-Files. The song is titled internationally as "Peace". The trance music single was officially released on 29 November 1999 in Germany and was peaking at number 24 on German Singles Chart in 1999 and at number 69 in Switzerland. The cover art work shows a graphic of an empty box.

The album version (Langspiel-Fassung) and the single and TV version (Fernseh-Fassung) of Ruhe are unlike versions with completely different music. Only the spoken words are the same. The spoken words of the song are including the poem "Über die Einsamkeit" by Swiss philosophical writer Johann Georg Zimmermann (1728-1795). The poem is:

Translation from German: "Peacefulness, the greatest happiness on earth, comes very often only through solitude into the heart."

Ruhe was featured in the 2009 German cinema movie Zweiohrküken and was included on the Official Sound Track of Zweiohrküken.

Track listing

Maxi single

Vinyl

Credits and personnel 

 Composed and produced by Christopher von Deylen and Mirko von Schlieffen
 Bass and rhythm guitar by Tissy Thiers
 Voice by Benjamin Völz
 Recorded and mixed at the Sleepingroom in Hamburg
 Voice recorded by Stefan Knauthe at the Kokon Studio in Berlin

Music video 

The official music video for "Ruhe" has a length of 3:45 minutes. The video features three couples with people of different ethnic origin, who are walking and strolling through an inner courtyard of an office building in the style of a Japanese garden. The video was aired and was shown for example on German music television channel VIVA in 1999.

Charts 

 References

External links 
 Official music video of Ruhe
 The music video of Ruhe
 Ruhe live
 The single on Discogs
 Lyrics of this song - Ruhe

Schiller (band) songs
1999 singles
Songs written by Christopher von Deylen
1999 songs